Owen Le Patourel Franklin FRCO, ARAM (14 August 1905 – July 1979) was an English composer and organist based in Doncaster and Ascot.

Life
He was born in London. His father was Ralph Walter Franklin, a dealer in leather canvas goods, and his mother was Bertha Laine Le Patourel from whom he gained his middle name. He was educated at Tollington School and Taunton School. He won the Hubert Kiver Prize at the Royal Academy of Music in 1923.

He was sub-professor of the Royal Academy of Music 1928–1929. He married Doris Mary Abey. They had one son, Derek Owen, born 12 April 1933. He served in the Royal Navy from 1941 - 1946. Whilst in York from 1946 to 1947 he was the conductor of the York Symphony Orchestra.

Appointments
Organist at St. Alban's Church, Holborn 1925-1928
Assistant organist at York Minster 1929–1941, and 1946
Organist at St. George's Church, Doncaster 1946-1957
Organist at Ascot Parish Church 1957-1975

Compositions
He wrote some anthems and a set of responses.

References

1905 births
1979 deaths
English organists
British male organists
Musicians from London
People educated at Taunton School
Alumni of the Royal Academy of Music
Academics of the Royal Academy of Music
Royal Navy personnel of World War II
20th-century classical musicians
20th-century English composers
20th-century organists
20th-century British male musicians